

Peerage of England

|rowspan="2"|Duke of Cornwall (1337)||Edward Tudor||1537||1547||Ascended the Throne, and the Dukedom merged in the Crown
|-
|none||1537||1603||
|-
|Duke of Norfolk (1483)||Thomas Howard, 3rd Duke of Norfolk||1524||1547||Attainted
|-
|rowspan="2"|Duke of Suffolk (1514)||Charles Brandon, 1st Duke of Suffolk||1514||1545||Died
|-
|Henry Brandon, 2nd Duke of Suffolk||1545||1551||
|-
|Duke of Somerset (1547)||Edward Seymour, 1st Duke of Somerset||1547||1552||New creation
|-
|Marquess of Dorset (1475)||Henry Grey, 3rd Marquess of Dorset||1530||1554||
|-
|Marquess of Northampton (1547)||William Parr, 1st Marquess of Northampton||1547||1571||New creation; Earl of Essex in 1543
|-
|rowspan="2"|Earl of Arundel (1138)||William FitzAlan, 18th Earl of Arundel||1524||1544||Died
|-
|Henry FitzAlan, 19th Earl of Arundel||1544||1580||
|-
|rowspan="2"|Earl of Oxford (1142)||John de Vere, 15th Earl of Oxford||1526||1540||Died
|-
|John de Vere, 16th Earl of Oxford||1540||1562||
|-
|rowspan="2"|Earl of Westmorland (1397)||Ralph Neville, 4th Earl of Westmorland||1499||1549||
|-
|Henry Neville, 5th Earl of Westmorland||1549||1564||
|-
|Earl of Shrewsbury (1442)||Francis Talbot, 5th Earl of Shrewsbury||1538||1560||
|-
|Earl of Essex (1461)||Henry Bourchier, 2nd Earl of Essex||1483||1540||Died, Earldom extinct
|-
|Earl of Kent (1465)||Henry Grey, 4th Earl of Kent||1524||1562||
|-
|Earl of Derby (1485)||Edward Stanley, 3rd Earl of Derby||1521||1572||
|-
|rowspan="2"|Earl of Worcester (1514)||Henry Somerset, 2nd Earl of Worcester||1526||1549||Died
|-
|William Somerset, 3rd Earl of Worcester||1549||1589||
|-
|rowspan="2"|Earl of Cumberland (1525)||Henry Clifford, 1st Earl of Cumberland||1525||1542||Died
|-
|Henry Clifford, 2nd Earl of Cumberland||1542||1570||
|-
|rowspan="2"|Earl of Rutland (1525)||Thomas Manners, 1st Earl of Rutland||1525||1543||Died
|-
|Henry Manners, 2nd Earl of Rutland||1543||1563||
|-
|rowspan="2"|Earl of Huntingdon (1529)||George Hastings, 1st Earl of Huntingdon||1529||1544||Died
|-
|Francis Hastings, 2nd Earl of Huntingdon||1544||1561||
|-
|rowspan="2"|Earl of Sussex (1529)||Robert Radcliffe, 1st Earl of Sussex||1529||1542||Died
|-
|Henry Radclyffe, 2nd Earl of Sussex||1542||1553||
|-
|Earl of Bath (1536)||John Bourchier, 2nd Earl of Bath||1539||1561||
|-
|Earl of Hertford (1537)||Edward Seymour, 1st Earl of Hertford||1537||1552||Created Duke of Somerset, see above
|-
|Earl of Southampton (1537)||William FitzWilliam, 1st Earl of Southampton||1537||1542||Died, title extinct
|-
|Earl of Bridgewater (1538)||Henry Daubeney, 1st Earl of Bridgewater||1538||1548||Died, title extinct
|-
|Earl of Essex (1540)||Thomas Cromwell, 1st Earl of Essex||1540||1540||New creation; attainted and his honours were forfeited
|-
|Earl of Southampton (1547)||Thomas Wriothesley, 1st Earl of Southampton||1547||1550||New creation; also created Baron Wriothesley in 1544
|-
|Earl of Warwick (1547)||John Dudley, 1st Earl of Warwick||1547||1553||New creation; Viscount Lisle in 1542
|-
|Viscount Lisle (1523)||Arthur Plantagenet, 1st Viscount Lisle||1523||1542||Died, title extinct
|-
|Baron Grey de Wilton (1295)||William Grey, 13th Baron Grey de Wilton||1520||1562||
|-
|Baron Clinton (1299)||Edward Clinton, 9th Baron Clinton||1517||1585||
|- 
|Baron De La Warr (1299)||Thomas West, 9th Baron De La Warr||1525||1554||
|- 
|Baron Ferrers of Chartley (1299)||Walter Devereux, 10th Baron Ferrers of Chartley||1501||1558||
|- 
|Baron Morley (1299)||Henry Parker, 10th Baron Morley||1518||1556||
|- 
|Baron Zouche of Haryngworth (1308)||John la Zouche, 8th Baron Zouche||1526||1550||
|- 
|Baron Audley of Heleigh (1313)||John Tuchet, 8th Baron Audley||1512||1557||
|- 
|Baron Cobham of Kent (1313)||George Brooke, 9th Baron Cobham||1529||1558||
|- 
|Baron Willoughby de Eresby (1313)||Catherine Willoughby, 12th Baroness Willoughby de Eresby||1526||1580||
|- 
|Baron Dacre (1321)||Thomas Fiennes, 9th Baron Dacre||1534||1541||Barony forfeited in 1541
|- 
|Baron Greystock (1321)||William Dacre, 7th Baron Greystoke||1516||1563||
|- 
|Baron Bourchier (1342)||Anne Bourchier, 7th Baroness Bourchier||1540||1571||Barony previously held by the Earl of Essex
|- 
|rowspan="2"|Baron Scrope of Bolton (1371)||John Scrope, 8th Baron Scrope of Bolton||1533||1549||Died
|- 
|Henry Scrope, 9th Baron Scrope of Bolton||1549||1591||
|- 
|Baron Lumley (1384)||John Lumley, 5th Baron Lumley||1510||1545||Died, Barony became forfeited
|- 
|Baron Bergavenny (1392)||Henry Nevill, 6th Baron Bergavenny||1536||1585||
|- 
|Baron Berkeley (1421)||Henry Berkeley, 7th Baron Berkeley||1534||1613||
|- 
|rowspan="2"|Baron Latimer (1432)||John Neville, 3rd Baron Latimer||1530||1543||Died
|- 
|John Neville, 4th Baron Latimer||1543||1577||
|- 
|Baron Dudley (1440)||John Sutton, 3rd Baron Dudley||1532||1553||
|- 
|Baron Saye and Sele (1447)||Richard Fiennes, 6th Baron Saye and Sele||1528||1573||
|- 
|rowspan="2"|Baron Stourton (1448)||William Stourton, 7th Baron Stourton||1535||1548||Died
|- 
|Charles Stourton, 8th Baron Stourton||1548||1557||
|- 
|rowspan="2"|Baron Ogle (1461)||Robert Ogle, 5th Baron Ogle||1530||1545||Died
|- 
|Robert Ogle, 6th Baron Ogle||1545||1562||
|- 
|rowspan="2"|Baron Mountjoy (1465)||Charles Blount, 5th Baron Mountjoy||1534||1544||Died
|- 
|James Blount, 6th Baron Mountjoy||1544||1582||
|- 
|Baron Grey of Powis (1482)||Edward Grey, 3rd Baron Grey of Powis||1504||1552||
|- 
|Baron Willoughby de Broke (1491)||Elizabeth Willoughby, 3rd Baroness Willoughby de Broke||1535||1562||
|- 
|Baron Conyers (1509)||John Conyers, 3rd Baron Conyers||1538||1557||
|- 
|Baron Monteagle (1514)||Thomas Stanley, 2nd Baron Monteagle||1523||1560||
|-
|Baron Vaux of Harrowden (1523)||Thomas Vaux, 2nd Baron Vaux of Harrowden||1523||1556||
|-
|rowspan="2"|Baron Sandys of the Vine (1529)||William Sandys, 1st Baron Sandys||1529||1540||Died
|-
|Thomas Sandys, 2nd Baron Sandys||1540||1560||
|-
|Baron Braye (1529)||John Braye, 2nd Baron Braye||1539||1557||
|-
|Baron Burgh (1529)||Thomas Burgh, 1st Baron Burgh||1529||1550||
|-
|rowspan="3"|Baron Tailboys (1529)||George Tailboys, 2nd Baron Tailboys of Kyme||1530||1540||Died
|-
|Robert Tailboys, 3rd Baron Tailboys of Kyme||1540||1542||
|-
|Elizabeth Tailboys, 4th Baroness Tailboys of Kyme||1542||1563||
|-
|rowspan="2"|Baron Windsor (1529)||Andrew Windsor, 1st Baron Windsor||1529||1543||Died
|-
|William Windsor, 2nd Baron Windsor||1543||1558||
|-
|Baron Wentworth (1529)||Thomas Wentworth, 1st Baron Wentworth||1529||1551||
|-
|Baron Mordaunt (1532)||John Mordaunt, 1st Baron Mordaunt||1532||1562||
|-
|Baron Cromwell (1536)||Thomas Cromwell, 1st Baron Cromwell||1536||1540||Created Earl of Essex, both title forfeited
|-
|Baron Audley of Walden (1538)||Thomas Audley, 1st Baron Audley of Walden||1538||1544||Died, title extinct
|-
|Baron St John of Basing (1539)||William Paulet, 1st Baron St John of Basing||1539||1572||
|-
|Baron Parr (1539)||William Parr, 1st Baron Parr||1539||1571||Created Marquess of Northampton, see above
|-
|Baron Russell (1540)||John Russel, 1st Baron Russell||1540||1555||New creation
|-
|Baron Cromwell (1540)||Gregory Cromwell, 1st Baron Cromwell||1540||1551||New creation
|-
|Baron Parr of Horton (1543)||William Parr, 1st Baron Parr of Horton||1543||1547||New creation; died, title extinct
|-
|rowspan="2"|Baron Eure (1544)||William Eure, 1st Baron Eure||1544||1548||New creation; died
|-
|William Eure, 2nd Baron Eure||1548||1594||
|-
|Baron Wharton (1545)||Thomas Wharton, 1st Baron Wharton||1545||1568||New creation
|-
|Baron Poynings (1545)||Thomas Poynings, 1st Baron Poynings||1545||1545||New creation; died, title extinct
|-
|rowspan="2"|Baron Sheffield (1547)||Edmund Sheffield, 1st Baron Sheffield||1547||1549||New creation; died
|-
|John Sheffield, 2nd Baron Sheffield||1549||1568||
|-
|Baron Seymour of Sudeley (1547)||Thomas Seymour, 1st Baron Seymour of Sudeley||1547||1549||New creation; died, Barony forfeited
|-
|Baron Rich (1547)||Richard Rich, 1st Baron Rich||1547||1567||New creation
|-
|Baron Willoughby of Parham (1547)||William Willoughby, 1st Baron Willoughby of Parham||1547||1570||New creation
|-
|Baron Lumley (1547)||John Lumley, 1st Baron Lumley||1547||1609||New creation
|-
|Baron Darcy of Aston (1548)||George Darcy, 1st Baron Darcy of Aston||1548||1558||New creation
|-
|}

Peerage of Scotland

|Duke of Rothesay (1398)||James Stewart, Duke of Rothesay||1540||1541||Died
|-
|Duke of Albany (1541)||Arthur Stewart, Duke of Albany||1541||1541||New creation; died, title extinct
|-
|Earl of Sutherland (1235)||John Gordon, 11th Earl of Sutherland||1535||1567||
|-
|Earl of Angus (1389)||Archibald Douglas, 6th Earl of Angus||1513||1557||
|-
|rowspan=2|Earl of Crawford (1398)||David Lindsay, 8th Earl of Crawford||1517||1542||Died
|-
|David Lindsay, 9th Earl of Crawford||1542||1558||
|-
|rowspan=2|Earl of Menteith (1427)||William Graham, 3rd Earl of Menteith||1537||1543||
|-
|John Graham, 4th Earl of Menteith||1543||1565||
|-
|Earl of Huntly (1445)||George Gordon, 4th Earl of Huntly||1524||1562||
|-
|rowspan=3|Earl of Erroll (1452)||William Hay, 5th Earl of Erroll||1513||1541||Died
|-
|William Hay, 6th Earl of Erroll||1541||1541||
|-
|George Hay, 7th Earl of Erroll||1541||1573||
|-
|Earl of Caithness (1455)||George Sinclair, 4th Earl of Caithness||1529||1582||
|-
|Earl of Argyll (1457)||Archibald Campbell, 4th Earl of Argyll||1529||1558||
|-
|rowspan=2|Earl of Atholl (1457)||John Stewart, 3rd Earl of Atholl||1521||1542||Died
|-
|John Stewart, 4th Earl of Atholl||1542||1579||
|-
|Earl of Morton (1458)||James Douglas, 3rd Earl of Morton||1513||1548||Died, Earldom fell into abeyance
|-
|Earl of Rothes (1458)||George Leslie, 4th Earl of Rothes||1513||1558||
|-
|Earl Marischal (1458)||William Keith, 4th Earl Marischal||1530||1581||
|-
|Earl of Buchan (1469)||John Stewart, 3rd Earl of Buchan||1505||1551||
|-
|rowspan=2|Earl of Glencairn (1488)||Cuthbert Cunningham, 3rd Earl of Glencairn||1490||1541||Died
|-
|Alexander Cunningham, 5th Earl of Glencairn||1541||1574||
|-
|Earl of Bothwell (1488)||Patrick Hepburn, 3rd Earl of Bothwell||1513||1556||
|-
|Earl of Lennox (1488)||Matthew Stewart, 4th Earl of Lennox||1526||1571||
|-
|Earl of Moray (1501)||James Stewart, 1st Earl of Moray||1501||1544||Died, title extinct
|-
|Earl of Arran (1503)||James Hamilton, 2nd Earl of Arran||1529||1575||
|-
|Earl of Montrose (1503)||William Graham, 2nd Earl of Montrose||1513||1571||
|-
|rowspan=3|Earl of Eglinton (1507)||Hugh Montgomerie, 1st Earl of Eglinton||1507||1545||Died
|-
|Hugh Montgomerie, 2nd Earl of Eglinton||1545||1546||Died
|-
|Hugh Montgomerie, 3rd Earl of Eglinton||1546||1585||
|-
|Earl of Cassilis (1509)||Gilbert Kennedy, 3rd Earl of Cassilis||1527||1558||
|-
|Lord Erskine (1429)||John Erskine, 5th Lord Erskine||1513||1552||de jure Earl of Mar
|-
|rowspan=2|Lord Somerville (1430)||Hugh Somerville, 5th Lord Somerville||1523||1549||Died
|-
|James Somerville, 6th Lord Somerville||1549||1569||
|-
|Lord Haliburton of Dirleton (1441)||Janet Haliburton, 7th Lady Haliburton of Dirleton||1502||1560||
|-
|rowspan=2|Lord Forbes (1442)||John Forbes, 6th Lord Forbes||1493||1547||Died
|-
|William Forbes, 7th Lord Forbes||1547||1593||
|-
|rowspan=2|Lord Maxwell (1445)||Robert Maxwell, 5th Lord Maxwell||1513||1546||Died
|-
|Robert Maxwell, 6th Lord Maxwell||1546||1553||
|-
|Lord Glamis (1445)||John Lyon, 7th Lord Glamis||1528||1558||
|-
|Lord Lindsay of the Byres (1445)||John Lindsay, 5th Lord Lindsay||1526||1563||
|-
|rowspan=2|Lord Saltoun (1445)||William Abernethy, 5th Lord Saltoun||1527||1543||Died
|-
|Alexander Abernethy, 6th Lord Saltoun||1543||1587||
|-
|rowspan=2|Lord Gray (1445)||Patrick Gray, 3rd Lord Gray||1514||1541||Died
|-
|Patrick Gray, 4th Lord Gray||1541||1584||
|-
|Lord Sinclair (1449)||William Sinclair, 4th Lord Sinclair||1513||1570||
|-
|rowspan=2|Lord Fleming (1451)||Malcolm Fleming, 3rd Lord Fleming||1524||1547||Died
|-
|James Fleming, 4th Lord Fleming||1547||1558||
|-
|rowspan=2|Lord Seton (1451)||George Seton, 6th Lord Seton||1513||1549||Died
|-
|George Seton, 7th Lord Seton||1549||1586||
|-
|rowspan=2|Lord Borthwick (1452)||William Borthwick, 4th Lord Borthwick||1513||1542||Died
|-
|John Borthwick, 5th Lord Borthwick||1542||1566||
|-
|Lord Boyd (1454)||Robert Boyd, 4th Lord Boyd||Aft. 1508||1558||
|-
|Lord Oliphant (1455)||Laurence Oliphant, 3rd Lord Oliphant||1516||1566||
|-
|Lord Livingston (1458)||Alexander Livingston, 5th Lord Livingston||1518||1553||
|-
|rowspan=2|Lord Cathcart (1460)||Alan Cathcart, 3rd Lord Cathcart||1535||1547||
|-
|Alan Cathcart, 4th Lord Cathcart||1547||1618||
|-
|rowspan=2|Lord Lovat (1464)||Hugh Fraser, 3rd Lord Lovat||1524||1544||Died
|-
|Alexander Fraser, 4th Lord Lovat||1544||1558||
|-
|Lord Innermeath (1470)||John Stewart, 4th Lord Innermeath||1532||1569||
|-
|Lord Carlyle of Torthorwald (1473)||Michael Carlyle, 4th Lord Carlyle||1526||1575||
|-
|rowspan=2|Lord Home (1473)||George Home, 4th Lord Home||1516||1549||Died
|-
|Alexander Home, 5th Lord Home||1549||1575||
|-
|Lord Ruthven (1488)||William Ruthven, 2nd Lord Ruthven||1528||1552||
|-
|Lord Crichton of Sanquhar (1488)||William Crichton, 5th Lord Crichton of Sanquhar||1536||1550||
|-
|Lord Drummond of Cargill (1488)||David Drummond, 2nd Lord Drummond||1519||1571||
|-
|rowspan=2|Lord Hay of Yester (1488)||John Hay, 3rd Lord Hay of Yester||1513||1543||Died
|-
|John Hay, 4th Lord Hay of Yester||1543||1557||
|-
|Lord Sempill (1489)||William Sempill, 2nd Lord Sempill||1513||1552||
|-
|rowspan=2|Lord Herries of Terregles (1490)||William Herries, 3rd Lord Herries of Terregles||1513||1543||Died
|-
|Agnes Maxwell, 4th Lady Herries of Terregles||1543||1594||
|-
|rowspan=2|Lord Ogilvy of Airlie (1491)||James Ogilvy, 4th Lord Ogilvy of Airlie||1524||1549||Died
|-
|James Ogilvy, 5th Lord Ogilvy of Airlie||1549||1606||
|-
|Lord Ross (1499)||Ninian Ross, 3rd Lord Ross||1513||1556||
|-
|Lord Avondale (1500)||Andrew Stewart, 2nd Lord Avondale||1513||1543||Exchanged the peerage for Lordship of Ochiltree, see below
|-
|rowspan=2|Lord Elphinstone (1509)||Alexander Elphinstone, 2nd Lord Elphinstone||1513||1547||Died
|-
|Robert Elphinstone, 3rd Lord Elphinstone||1547||1602||
|-
|Lord Methven (1528)||Henry Stewart, 1st Lord Methven||1528||1552||
|-
|rowspan=2|Lord Ochiltree (1543)||Andrew Stewart, 1st Lord Ochiltree||1543||1548||New creation; died
|-
|Andrew Stewart, 2nd Lord Ochiltree||1548||1591||
|-
|}

Peerage of Ireland

|rowspan=2|Earl of Ormond (1328)||James Butler, 9th Earl of Ormond||1539||1546||Died
|-
|Thomas Butler, 10th Earl of Ormond||1546||1614||
|-
|rowspan=2|Earl of Desmond (1329)||James FitzGerald, de jure 12th Earl of Desmond||1534||1540||Died
|-
|James FitzGerald, 14th Earl of Desmond||1540||1558||
|-
|Earl of Waterford (1446)||Francis Talbot, 5th Earl of Waterford||1538||1560||
|-
|Earl of Tyrone (1542)||Conn O'Neill, 1st Earl of Tyrone||1542||1559||New creation
|-
|rowspan=2|Earl of Clanricarde (1543)||Ulick na gCeann Burke, 1st Earl of Clanricarde||1543||1544||New creation; died
|-
|Richard Burke, 2nd Earl of Clanricarde||1544||1582||
|-
|Earl of Thomond (1543)||Murrough O'Brien, 1st Earl of Thomond||1543||1551||New creation
|-
|Viscount Gormanston (1478)||Jenico Preston, 3rd Viscount Gormanston||1532||1569||
|-
|Viscount Grane (1536)||Leonard Grey, 1st Viscount Grane||1536||1541||Peerage forfeited
|-
|Viscount Buttevant (1541)||John FitzJohn Barry, 1st Viscount Buttevant||1541||1553||New creation
|-
|rowspan=2|Viscount Baltinglass (1541)||Thomas Eustace, 1st Viscount Baltinglass||1541||1549||New creation; died
|-
|Rowland Eustace, 2nd Viscount Baltinglass||1549||1578||
|-
|Viscount Clontarf (1541)||John Rawson, 1st Viscount Clontarf||1541||1578||New creation; died, title extinct
|-
|Viscount Kilmaule (1537)||Edmond Fitzmaurice, 1st Viscount Kilmaule||1537||1541||Died, title extinct
|-
|rowspan=2|Baron Athenry (1172)||John de Bermingham||1529||1547||Died
|-
|Richard II de Bermingham||1547||1580||
|-
|Baron Kingsale (1223)||Gerald de Courcy, 17th Baron Kingsale||1535||1599||
|-
|rowspan=4|Baron Kerry (1223)||Patrick Fitzmaurice, 12th Baron Kerry||1541||1547||Died
|-
|Thomas Fitzmaurice, 13th Baron Kerry||1547||1549||Died
|-
|Edmond Fitzmaurice, 14th Baron Kerry||1549||1549||Died
|-
|Gerard Fitzmaurice, 15th Baron Kerry||1549||1550||
|-
|Baron Barry (1261)||John FitzJohn Barry, 14th Baron Barry||1534||1553||Created Viscount Buttevant, see above
|-
|Baron Slane (1370)||James Fleming, 9th Baron Slane||1517||1578||
|-
|rowspan=3|Baron Howth (1425)||Christopher St Lawrence, 5th Baron Howth||1526||1542||Died
|-
|Edward St Lawrence, 6th Baron Howth||1542||1549||Died
|-
|Richard St Lawrence, 7th Baron Howth||1549||1558||
|-
|Baron Killeen (1449)||John Plunkett, 5th Baron Killeen||1510||1550||
|-
|Baron Trimlestown (1461)||Patrick Barnewall, 4th Baron Trimlestown||1538||1562||
|-
|Baron Dunsany (1462)||Robert Plunkett, 5th Baron of Dunsany||1521||1559||
|-
|Baron Delvin (1486)||Richard Nugent, 5th Baron Delvin||1537||1559||
|-
|Baron Kilcullen (1535)||Thomas Eustace, 1st Baron Kilcullen||1535||1549||Created Viscount Baltinglass, see above
|-
|rowspan=2|Baron Power (1535)||Piers Power, 2nd Baron Power||1539||1545||Died
|-
|John Power, 3rd Baron Power||1545||1592||
|-
|Baron Dunboyne (1541)||Edmond Butler, 1st Baron Dunboyne||1541||1566||New creation
|-
|Baron Louth (1541)||Oliver Plunkett, 1st Baron Louth||1541||1555||New creation
|-
|rowspan=2|Baron Carbery (1541)||William de Bermingham, 1st Baron Carbery||1541||1548||New creation; died
|-
|Edward de Bermingham, 2nd Baron Carbery||1548||1550||
|-
|Baron Upper Ossory (1541)||Barnaby Fitzpatrick, 1st Baron Upper Ossory||1541||1575||New creation
|-
|Baron Cahir (1543)||Thomas Butler, 1st Baron Cahir||1543||1558||New creation
|-
|}

References

 

Lists of peers by decade
1540s in England
1540s in Ireland
16th century in England
16th century in Scotland
16th century in Ireland
16th-century English nobility
16th-century Scottish peers
16th-century Irish people
Peers